Stylocline (neststraw) is a small genus of North American desert plants in the tribe Gnaphalieae within the family Asteraceae.

Neststraw is native to the southwestern United States and northern Mexico.

Description
Species of Stylocline are generally small plants, and certain ones are difficult to distinguish from each other because identifying characteristics are too small to see with the naked eye.

They are annuals with woolly, hairy, or spiderwebby textures. Thin stems end in heads of disc flowers or tubular pistillate flowers. The fruits are smooth and shiny and encapsulated within the disc heads.

Species
Species include:
 Stylocline citroleum - oil neststraw — California (Kern + San Diego Counties)
 Stylocline gnaphaloides - mountain neststraw — California, Arizona
 Stylocline intertexta - Morefield's neststraw — California, Arizona, Nevada, Utah
 Stylocline masonii - Mason's neststraw — California (Kern, Los Angeles, San Luis Obispo, & Monterey Counties)
 Stylocline micropoides - woolly neststraw — Sonora, Baja California, California, Arizona, Nevada, Utah, New Mexico, Texas
 Stylocline psilocarphoides - baretwig neststraw — California, Nevada, Oregon, Idaho, Utah
 Stylocline sonorensis - Sonoran neststraw — Sonora, California (Riverside County), and Arizona (Pima, Pinal, Santa Cruz, & Graham Counties)

Former species
Species formerly included and reclassified:
 Stylocline acaulis  — Hesperevax acaulis 
 Stylocline amphibola —  Micropus amphibolus
 Stylocline amphiloba  — Micropus amphibolus 
 Stylocline griffithii  —  Cymbolaena griffithii 
 Stylocline filaginea var. filaginea —  Ancistrocarphus filagineus See also other species of the genera Ancistrocarphus, Cymbolaena, Hesperevax, and  Micropus.References

External links
 USDA Plants Profile for Stylocline (neststraw)
   CalFlora Database: Stylocline (neststraw) links — native California species ''.
 Jepson Manual (TJM) treatment: Stylocline

 
Asteraceae genera
North American desert flora
Taxa named by Thomas Nuttall